Socialist Rebirth was a minor social-democratic political party in Italy. The group was founded in 1993 from a split from the Italian Socialist Party (PSI) led by Giorgio Benvenuto, who contested the continuing PSI led by Ottaviano Del Turco which had lost a lot of electors. The RS and PSI were both members of the Alliance of Progressives coalition of centre-left parties formed to contest the 1994 general election. In 1995, RS merged into the Labour Federation, which itself merged into Democrats of the Left in 1998.

References

1993 establishments in Italy
1995 disestablishments in Italy
Defunct social democratic parties in Italy
Defunct political parties in Italy
Political parties disestablished in 1995
Political parties established in 1993